The General Motors J platform, or J-body, is an automobile platform that was used by General Motors for compact cars from the 1982 to 2005 model years.  The third generation of compact cars designed by GM, the J-body marked the introduction of front-wheel drive for its compact model lines, replacing the rear-wheel drive H platform. The J-body was marketed as a world car, with GM brands selling versions of the platform in North America, Europe, Australia, and Japan; in markets outside of North America, the model line was packaged as a mid-size car.

Outside North America, the use of the J platform was phased out after the 1980s in favor of the Opel-based GM2900 platform. In North America, the introduction of the Saturn S-Series would lead to the consolidation of the J-body to the Chevrolet and Pontiac brands.  

Following several major revisions, the J platform remained in use into the 21st century; in June 2005, the final example (a Pontiac Sunfire) was produced.  Introduced by Saturn for 2003, the GM Delta platform is the fourth generation of compact cars from General Motors.

Background 
The design of the J-car began in 1976. Originally, the J-car was only intended for the Chevrolet and Pontiac brands, but soon thereafter Oldsmobile and Buick were added. At the time, GM-controlled divisions in different parts of the world manufactured totally different rear-wheel drive C-segment cars – the Chevrolet Vega in America, the Vauxhall Cavalier/Opel Ascona in Europe, the Holden Torana in Australia and the Isuzu Florian in Japan. It was decided that a common replacement would be developed to eliminate duplication of engineering effort and ensure parts interchangeability – a practice known as badge engineering or platform-sharing. In November 1979, subsequent to the second fuel crisis and only 14 months before the cars introduction, it was decided to create a Cadillac derivative as well. Aside from a hefty price tag, the hastily developed Cimarron had little to distinguish it from the other J-car offerings.

In continental Europe, the car was sold as the Opel Ascona. In Britain, it was known as the Vauxhall Cavalier. Irrespective of badging, European production of the J-body occurred in plants in Germany, Belgium, and Britain. It was generally well received but was narrowly beaten to the European Car of the Year accolade by the Renault 9. The Vauxhall Cavalier version was particularly successful in Britain, where it was the second best selling car in 1984 and 1985 and managed around 800,000 sales across a seven-year production run. At the time, it set new standards for performance and economy in this size of car in Europe; for instance, the 1.6 petrol engined Cavalier for the British market had a top speed of 105 mph, compared to the 101 mph top speed of the 2.0 petrol engined Ford Cortina – its key competitor for a year until the Ford Sierra was launched in 1982.  Due to the exterior dimensions, and the engines offered being in compliance with Japanese regulations, the platform was classed in the favorable "compact" designation allowing the Isuzu Aska to compete with other Japanese made products sold in the domestic market at the time. Isuzu also supplied kits for Holden's J-car version, the Camira.

The fourth character in the Vehicle Identification Number for a J-body car is "J".

Development
The platform received two major cosmetic redesigns, in 1988 and a more thorough makeover in 1995, along with major powertrain revisions. The 1995 makeover was only sold in North America, as General Motors subsidiaries in other countries had replaced it (mainly with cars based on the GM2900 platform). This makeover had originally been planned for the 1992 model year when work begain in 1988, but General Motors' bad finances forced them to postpone it twice.

A variety of convertible versions were developed as well, from fully official to purely aftermarket. Hammond & Thiede's version originated with the Karosseriefabrik Voll, which was taken over by H&T in 1985.

Models
Over its 24-year production run, the GM J platform would be sold under 16 different nameplates (five under the Pontiac brand alone). During the 1980s, a version of the J platform would be marketed by every division of General Motors in North America (with the exception of GMC).

Over 5.8 million of the original (pre-1995 facelift) J-cars were sold in North America. Approximately 10,150,000 GM J platform cars were sold across eleven marques on six continents from 1982 through 1997. Consequently, it is the fifth best selling automobile platform in automotive history.

References

List of GM VIN codes

J